The women's 200 metre breaststroke event, included in the swimming competition at the 1972 Summer Olympics, took place on August 29, at the Olympia Schwimmhalle. In this event, swimmers covered four lengths of the 50-metre (160 ft) Olympic-sized pool employing the breaststroke. It was the eleventh appearance of the event, which first appeared at the 1924 Summer Olympics in Paris. A total of 40 competitors from 23 nations participated in the event, another 2 entries from 2 other countries did not compete.

Records
Prior to this competition, the existing world and Olympic records were:

The following records were established during the competition:

Results

Heats

Final

Sources

References

Women's breaststroke 200 metre
1972 in women's swimming
Women's events at the 1972 Summer Olympics